Water Stories is an album by German andean new age band Cusco. It was released in 1990 as their third album for the Higher Octave music label. The album peaked at #11 on the Billboard Top New Age albums chart in 1991.

The album celebrates some of the world's major water bodies and surrounding areas. Although presented as a proper album, it contains tracks from throughout the early career of the band, and was designed as a sort of "best of" collection. Compared to Mystic Island, this album's tracks mostly come from the albums Cusco II, Virgin Islands and Ring der Delphine, but has selected tracks from other albums as well, as well as the brand new track "Chorus", an alternate version of "Flying Condor" from the Apurimac album. Each track has been remastered for this release. Additionally, some of the tracks have been edited to shorten them, most noticeably "Bur Said", "Jebel at Tarik", and "Bodensee".

Track listing
 "Waters of Cesme"
 "Java"
 "Seychelles"
 "Lake Erie"
 "Bur Said"
 "Jebel at Tarik"
 "Sun of Jamaica"
 "Lake of the Ozarks"
 "Alcatraz"
 "Bodensee"
 "Aurora"
 "Chorus"

Album credits
Michael Holm – Arranger, producer, vocals, keyboard
Kristian Schultze – Arranger, keyboard
Billy Lang – Guitar
Johan Daansen - Guitar
Todd Canedy - Drums
Gunther Gebauer Bass

References

1990 albums
Cusco (band) albums